Nate Roberts may refer to:

Nate Roberts (skier), American freestyle skier
Nate Roberts (TV character), TV character in The Bill